Peeter Laurits (born in 1962 in Tallinn) is an Estonian artist and photographer.

Since 1990s he has exhibited his works on numerous exhibitions. His works are strongly related to photography.

He has been a founder of several artistical collectives, including Igavesti Sinu, DeStudio, and Kütioru Avatud Ateljee.

In 2005 he was awarded with Order of the White Star, V class.

Gallery

References

Living people
1962 births
20th-century Estonian male artists
21st-century Estonian male artists
Estonian photographers
Academic staff of the University of Tartu
Recipients of the Order of the White Star, 4th Class
Artists from Tallinn
People from Tallinn